Notodden New Station served Notodden, Norway from 1919 to 2004, and again from 2015 to 2020. The station was designed by Gudmund Hoel, finished in 1917 and taken into use two years later when the Bratsberg Line opened.

The new line needed a higher starting position for the line southwards. In 2004 Notodden Public Transport Terminal was created,  further into town.

On December 13 2020, this station on the Tinnoset line was closed, and instead a newer single platform terminal station, close to the site of the original station, came into use.  This latest station (with newly track laid to it but without electrification) was renamed Notodden stasjon (from Notodden Gamle stasjon) and is now adjacent to the Public Transport Terminal (Notodden skysstasjon).

References

External links
 Norwegian Railway Club entry

Railway stations on the Tinnoset Line
Railway stations on the Bratsberg Line
Railway stations in Notodden
Railway stations opened in 1919
Railway stations closed in 2004
Disused railway stations in Norway
1919 establishments in Norway
2004 disestablishments in Norway